Andrés Zanini (born 18 January 1997) is an Argentine professional footballer who plays as a defender for Acassuso.

Career
Zanini started his senior career with Primera División side Tigre; having joined their youth ranks in 2007. Although he didn't appear competitively for the club, he was once an unused substitute for a fixture with San Lorenzo on 2 April 2017. Zanini left at the end of the following 2017–18 campaign, signing for Acassuso of Primera B Metropolitana on 30 June 2018. His first appearance arrived in September versus Deportivo Español.

Career statistics
.

References

External links

1997 births
Living people
Place of birth missing (living people)
Argentine footballers
Association football defenders
Primera B Metropolitana players
Club Atlético Tigre footballers
Club Atlético Acassuso footballers